Oliwier Sławiński (born 15 April 2005) is a Polish professional footballer who plays as a forward for Zagłębie Lubin.

Career statistics

Club

Notes

References

External links

2005 births
Living people
Association football forwards
Polish footballers
Poland youth international footballers
Zagłębie Lubin players
III liga players
II liga players
Ekstraklasa players